The Pissot Formation is a geologic formation in the Armorican Massif of Normandy, northwestern France. It preserves fossils dating back to the Darriwilian to Sandbian (Dobrotivian in the regional stratigraphy) stages of the Ordovician period.

Fossil content 
The following fossils have been reported from the formation:

Trilobites 
 Dalmanitina (Eodalmanitina) destombesi
 Morgatia hupei
 Dionide sp.

See also 
 List of fossiliferous stratigraphic units in France

References

Bibliography 
 J.-L. Henry. 1980. Trilobites ordoviciens du Massif armoricain. Mémoires de la Société Géologique et Minéralogique de Bretagne 22:1-250
 J. L. Henry and M. Romano. 1978. Le genre Dionide Barrande, 1847 (Trilobite) dans l'Ordovicien du Massif Armoricain et du Portugal. Géobios 11(3):327-343

Geologic formations of France
Ordovician System of Europe
Ordovician France
Darriwilian
Sandbian
Siltstone formations
Ordovician south paleopolar deposits
Paleontology in France
Formations